Mountain Road is a census-designated place (CDP) in Halifax County, Virginia, United States. The population as of the 2010 census was 1,100.

Geography
The CDP is an area along Virginia Route 360 (Mountain Road) in central Halifax County. It is bordered to the east by the town of Halifax, the county seat.

References

Census-designated places in Halifax County, Virginia
Census-designated places in Virginia